Aasmund Olav Sandland (born 4 July 1949) is a Norwegian football midfielder and later lawyer.

He spent most of his career in Lyn, amassing 117 league games and 26 cup games. Four of the seasons were spent on the first tier, four on the second tier. Sandland also represented Norway as an U19, U21 and senior international. He later played for Eidsvold Turn in 1979, then Stabæk from 1980 through 1982.

Sandland later became a lawyer, and was among others a defender in the Heggelund case.

References

1949 births
Living people
Norwegian footballers
Lyn Fotball players
Eidsvold TF players
Stabæk Fotball players
Norway youth international footballers
Norway under-21 international footballers
Norway international footballers
Association football midfielders
20th-century Norwegian lawyers